Pablo Rago (born September 24, 1972 in Buenos Aires) is an Argentine actor. He has acted in the films The Official Story (as a child actor) and The Secret in Their Eyes; both Argentine films have won the Academy Award for Best Foreign Language Film, and he has acted in many other films and productions.

Works

Film 
 1978: Las travesuras de Cepillo
 1982: Últimos días de la víctima (Bruno Külpe)
 1983: Gracias por el fuego (Ramón Budiño niño)
 1985: The Official Story (son of Enrique)
 1995: La pasión de Mitjans
 1996: El mundo contra mí
 1999: El mar de Lucas (Facundo Denevi)
 2001: Déjala correr (René)
 2002: Apasionados (Roberto)
 2004: Próxima salida (Daniel)
 2005: El buen destino (David)
 2007: La mujer rota (Juan)
 2008: Yo soy sola (Pablo)
 2008: La leyenda (Juan Manuel Migliardi)
 2009: 100% lucha, el amo de los clones
 2009: The Secret in Their Eyes (Morales)
 2009: La última vuelta (under production)
 2010: Manuel Belgrano (Manuel Belgrano)
 2013: Underdogs (Capi)
 2015: No Film
 2017: You Only Live Once
 2020: The Heist of the Century

Theater

Actor 
 1995: Yepeto
 1998: Perla
 1999: La reina de la belleza
 2001: Pingüinos
 2002: Hombre y superhombre
 2003: Romeo y Julieta
 2004: La prueba
 2006: Extraña pareja
 2008: Extraña pareja

Director 
 2006: Extraña pareja

Television 
 1977: Mi hermano Javier
 1977: 13 historias de amor (Canal 13)
 1979: Novia de vacaciones (Canal 13)
 1980: Dónde pueda quererte (Canal 11)
 1980: Rosa de lejos (ATC)
 1981: Especiales de Alejandro Doria (ATC)
 1984: Historia de un trepador (Canal 13)
 1986: Por siempre amigos (Canal 13)
 1987-1990: Clave de sol (Canal 13)
 1990-1993: Amigos son los amigos (Telefé and Canal 9)
 1994: Inconquistable corazón (Canal 9)
 1994-1995: Alta comedia (Canal 9)
 1995: Por siempre mujercitas (Canal 9)
 1996: Sueltos (Canal 13)
 1997: Los hermanos Pérez Conde (Canal 9)
 1998: Gasoleros (Canal 13)
 1999: El hombre (Canal 13)
 2000: Primicias (Canal 13)
 2001: Los buscas de siempre (Azul TV)
 2002: Kachorra (Telefé)
 2003: Resistiré (Telefe)
 2004: Mosca y Smith (Telefé)
 2005: Conflictos en red (Telefé)
 2005: Algo habrán hecho por la historia argentina, playing Mariano Moreno (Telefe)
 2006: Vientos de agua (Canal 13)
 2006: Mujeres asesinas (Canal 13)
 2008: Mujeres asesinas (Italia)
 2008: Todos contra Juan (Telefe)/(América)
 2009: Enseñame a vivir (Canal 13)
 2010: Botineras (Telefé)
 2011–present: Television Registrada (Canal 9) (co-host)

References

External links 
 

1972 births
Argentine male actors
Argentine male voice actors
Living people
People from Buenos Aires